On November 16, 2009, Jamar Pinkney Sr. murdered his 15-year-old son, Jamar Pinkney Jr. in an execution-style shooting in Detroit, Michigan.

Pinkney Sr. said that Pinkney Jr. had admitted to sexually assaulting his 3-year old half-sister before he assaulted him, forced him to take off his clothes, marched him down the street while naked to a vacant lot, forced him to kneel and shot him in the head.

On April 15, 2010, Pinkney Sr. was found guilty of murdering and assaulting Pinkney Jr. with a deadly weapon. He was sentenced to life imprisonment with the possibility of parole after 37 years.

On November 15, 2012, the Michigan Court of Appeals denied Pinkney Sr.'s appeal and upheld his murder conviction.

Murder 
Jamar Pinkney Jr. was a 15-year-old high school sophomore at Martin Luther King High School in Detroit. He was described as "articulate" and "always smiling". He was a student who received A's, B's, and C's in his courses.

According to court records, Pinkney Jr. first admitted to his mother Lazette Cherry that he had sexually assaulted his half-sister. She said that he seemed remorseful about his actions and requested therapy. The day before the murder, Pinkney Jr. reportedly admitted to his father, Jamar Pinkney Sr. that he had sexually assaulted his 3-year old half-sister, though he previously denied doing anything. The next morning, Pinkney Sr. went to the duplex house where Pinkney Jr. and his mother, Lazette Cherry were located. When Pinkney Jr. allegedly admitted in person that he had sexually assaulted his half-sister, Pinkney Sr. began beating him. Yolanda Cherry, Lazette Cherry's sister, and another woman, LaTonya Prather were in the upstairs portion of the duplex, while Pinkney Sr., Pinkney Jr., and Lazette were in the downstairs portion. When Pinkney Sr. started to beat Pinkney Jr., Yolanda and Prather both heard the commotion coming from downstairs and both went down to investigate, with Yolanda quickly heading down first. Because the units were in a duplex, they had to walk down, exit outside, and then enter the front door of the downstairs unit. Yolanda was first to enter the downstairs, and she saw Pinkney Sr. beating Pinkney Jr. Yolanda pushed Pinkney Sr. away from Pinkney Jr. In response to being shoved by Yolanda, Pinkney Sr. pulled a gun and pointed it first at Yolanda and then later at Lazette, while threatening to the both of them. Yolanda raised her hands and started backing away from Pinkney Sr., and he then resumed his attack on Pinkney Jr.

After Pinkney Sr. forced Yolanda and Prather to leave, Pinkney Sr. pistol-whipped Pinkney Jr. and made him strip his clothes. Pinkney Sr. then marched Pinkney Jr. down the street naked to a vacant lot, and made Pinkney Jr. kneel. Pinkney Jr. began pleading for his life and begging, "No, Daddy! No!" Pinkney Sr. then shot Pinkney Jr. in the head.

Trial 
Pinkney Sr. was initially arrested and charged with premeditated first-degree murder, three counts of assault with a dangerous weapon, and possession of a firearm during a felony.

During his trial, Pinkney Sr. did not deny shooting Pinkney Jr., but said it was in the heat of the moment and therefore he was only guilty of a lesser offense of voluntary manslaughter.

Pinkney Sr. said that Pinkney Jr. initially said to him, "Daddy, I'm sorry, can you forgive me? I got up from the couch and went into the bedroom, I pulled my shorts and my underwear off and I got on top of her." Pinkney Sr. said that was when he "lost it".

The jury found Pinkney Sr. guilty of second-degree murder, three counts of assault with a dangerous weapon, and possession of a firearm during a felony. The prosecution pursued a first-degree murder charge, but the jury decided on the lesser offense of second-degree murder. This was a lesser conviction than the prosecution had pursued, but a higher conviction than the voluntary manslaughter conviction that the defense advocated for.

Lazette Cherry, Pinkney Jr.'s mother, said in the sentencing portion of the trial. "I will never hear his voice again. I will never see his smile. He took that away from me. When he put matters in his own hands, he was the judge, the jury, and the executioner. Your honor, I ask you. He needs to spend the rest of his life in jail." Pinkney Sr. said during the sentencing phase of the trial, "I'm sad about losing my son. I am horrified by what I did. I hope one day I could be a responsible parent again, a responsible citizen."

Pinkney Sr. was sentenced to 37 to 80 years in prison, a de facto sentence of life imprisonment with the possibility of parole after 37 years. He was also ordered to pay $6,600 for his son's funeral expenses. Sentencing guidelines for second-degree murder in Michigan only call for 19 to 31 years, but Wayne County Circuit Judge Brian Sullivan said the horrific nature of the crime demanded more severe punishment for Pinkney Sr. Sullivan commented, "He beat him, stripped him naked, paraded him down the street. The only inference which can be drawn is to humiliate him and take his life."

See also
 List of homicides in Michigan

Notes

References

2009 in Detroit
2009 in Michigan
2009 murders in the United States
Gun violence in the United States
Deaths by person in Michigan
Incidents of violence against boys
Murder in Michigan
November 2009 crimes in the United States
Deaths by firearm in Michigan